Tuchkovo is an urban locality (a work settlement) in Ruzsky District, Moscow Oblast, Russia. Population:

References

Urban-type settlements in Moscow Oblast